Say Goodbye to Pretty Boy is a 2020 EP by Bartees Strange, covering songs by The National.

Critical reception
Emily Fox of Exclaim! rated this EP an eight out of 10, calling it "a beautiful, radical, and poignant political album". The album was released on the digital platform Bandcamp, which promoted the release with a review that characterizes this recording as taking "all of the original ingredients and uses a completely different recipe to create a new, distinct flavor".

Track listing
"About Today" (Matt Berninger and Aaron Dessner) – 3:48
"Lemonworld" (Matt Berninger and Bryce Dessner) – 3:16
"Mr. November" (Matt Berninger and Aaron Dessner) – 4:13
"The Geese of Beverly Road" (Matt Berninger, Aaron Dessner, and Scott Devendorf) – 3:24
"All the Wine" (Matt Berninger, Aaron Dessner, Bryce Dessner, Bryan Devendorf, and Scott Devendorf) – 2:46
"A Reasonable Man (I Don't Mind)" (Padma Newsome) – 4:54
"Looking for Astronauts" (Matt Berninger, Bryce Dessner, and Scott Devendorf) – 2:30
"Going Going" – 4:18
"HAGS" – 3:32
Bandcamp-exclusive bonus track
"Far" – 3:50

Personnel
Musicians
Bartees Strange
Brian Demeglio
Ceilidh Gao
Dan Kleederman
Brian Turnmire
Dillon Treacy
Carter Zumtobel

Technical personnel
Chris Connors – mastering and mixing
Brian Dimeglio – engineering
Spencer Murphy – production and engineering
Graham Richman – production and engineering
Bartees Strange – engineering
Carter Zumtobel – engineering

References

External links
Page from Brassland

2022 debut EPs
Bartees Strange albums
The National (band)
Political music albums by American artists
Brassland Records EPs